Théo Chendri (born 27 May 1997) is a French footballer who currently plays as a midfielder for Zamora.

Club career
Born in Toulouse, Chendri started his career with Etoile Aussonnaise and US Colomiers, before trialling with Spanish side Barcelona in 2011. A year later, he made the move to La Masia, becoming the first Frenchman to join the prestigious academy. This deal was investigated by international body FIFA, who handed Barcelona a transfer ban, and banned Chendri from playing until he was sixteen - a decision Barcelona unsuccessfully appealed against. Following this verdict, Chendri's mother gave an interview with Spanish newspaper La Vanguardia, stating that FIFA's decision was doing more harm to the young footballers concerned than the clubs who had breached the rules.

At the age of eighteen, he was promoted to the Barcelona B team, and made one appearance in the 2015–16 Segunda División B. In 2016, then-sporting director of Barcelona, Robert Fernández, asked Chendri, whose contract was set to expire, to try and convince Ousmane Dembélé to sign for La Blaugrana, but this plan failed as Dembélé joined German side Borussia Dortmund.

Chendri left Barcelona in 2016, after four years with the club. In July of the same year, he returned to France and signed a three-year deal with Nantes, being assigned to the reserve team in the Championnat de France Amateur. A year after joining Nantes, he stated his frustration in an interview with Au Premier Poteau, stating that Nantes had "sold him a bit of a dream" in terms of his progression with the club, as he had been assigned to the reserve side again.

In early 2019, he moved to Denmark to sign with second tier side Fremad Amager. Having initially settled well, his contract was terminated by mutual consent after a year and a half with the club.

Following his departure from Fremad Amager, he returned to Spain, joining Tercera División side Formentera in January 2021. He signed a one-year contract extension in July of the same year. A year later, he signed with Badajoz in the Primera Federación, alongside fellow former Barcelona B player Jesús Alfaro. However, after only half a year with Badajoz, he was released in December 2022.

Following his release from Badajoz, he joined Segunda Federación side Zamora on 26 January 2023.

International career
Chendri is eligible to represent both France and Algeria at international level. He has represented France from under-17 to under-19 level.

Career statistics

Club

Notes

References

External links
 

1997 births
Living people
Footballers from Toulouse
French footballers
France youth international footballers
Association football midfielders
Segunda División B players
Championnat National 2 players
Championnat National 3 players
Danish 1st Division players
Tercera División players
Segunda Federación players
Primera Federación players
US Colomiers Football players
FC Barcelona players
FC Barcelona Atlètic players
FC Nantes players
Fremad Amager players
SD Formentera players
CD Badajoz players
French expatriate footballers
French expatriate sportspeople in Spain
Expatriate footballers in Spain
French expatriate sportspeople in Denmark
Expatriate men's footballers in Denmark